Schoffner Corner is an unincorporated community in Jefferson County, in the U.S. state of Pennsylvania.

History
Schoffner's Corners was the second post office of Polk Township. A post office was established as Schoffner's Corners in 1859, and remained in operation until 1913.

References

Unincorporated communities in Jefferson County, Pennsylvania
Unincorporated communities in Pennsylvania